Bujik Do (also Romanized as Būjīk Do; also known as Būjīkdān) is a village in Bu ol Kheyr Rural District, Delvar District, Tangestan County, Bushehr Province, Iran. At the 2006 census, its population was 63, in 14 families.

References 

Populated places in Tangestan County